The International Brain Bee (IBB) is a neuroscience competition for teenagers. The IBB was founded in 1999 by Dr. Norbert Myslinski, and consists of over 200 chapters in more than 50 regions on 6 continents. Its purpose is to help treat and find cures for brain disorders by inspiring and motivating young men and women to pursue careers in basic and clinical neuroscience.

The IBB governing body is a consortium consisting of the American Psychological Association, Dana Alliance for Brain Initiatives, Federation of European Neuroscience Societies, International Brain Research Organization, and Society for Neuroscience. Winners of the chapter competitions are invited to compete in their respective region championships, where they vie for the right to compete in the world championship. Past venues for the world championship include Montreal, Canada; San Diego, USA; Vienna, Austria; Washington, DC, USA; Cape Town, South Africa; Florence, Italy; Cairns, Australia; Baltimore, USA; Toronto, Canada; and Copenhagen, Denmark.

Past champions

International

Winners at the international level competed against representatives from other nations.

United States

Winners at the national level competed against representatives from other states.

Location
Local brain bees take place in their respective states, while the National Brain Bee in the United States is usually held in Baltimore, Maryland. The site of the International Brain Bee changes yearly:

2009: Toronto, Canada
2010: San Diego, California, USA
2011: Florence, Italy
2012: Cape Town, South Africa
2013: Vienna, Austria
2014: Washington, D.C., USA
2015: Cairns, Australia
2016: Copenhagen, Denmark
2017: Washington, D.C., USA
2018: Berlin, Germany
2019: Daegu, South Korea
2020: Washington, D.C., USA

External links 
International Brain Bee website: thebrainbee.org.

See also 

 Deutsche Neurowissenschaften-Olympiade

References

Neuroscience competitions
Neuroscience organizations